Aghajari Rural District is a rural district (dehestan) in Aghajari District, Behbahan County, Khuzestan Province, Iran. At the 2006 census, its population was 3, in 1 family.  The rural district has 10 villages.

References 

Rural Districts of Khuzestan Province
Behbahan County